Maddison Inglis (born 14 January 1998) is an Australian tennis player.

She has a career-high singles ranking of 112, achieved on 2 March 2020. Inglis has won five singles and three doubles titles on the ITF Circuit.

Career

2015: Grand Slam debut
Inglis made her Grand Slam main-draw debut at the 2015 Australian Open in the doubles event, partnering Alexandra Nancarrow.

2016
She was awarded a main draw wildcard into the 2016 Australian Open after she won the Wildcard Playoff, defeating Arina Rodionova in the final, in straight sets. She lost in round one to 21st-seed Ekaterina Makarova.

2020
In January 2020, Inglis won the Burnie International, increasing her ranking to a career high of No. 116.

2022: Australian Open third round, Wimbledon debut
Inglis made her first Grand Slam third round at the Australian Open. She defeated 23rd seed Leylah Fernandez and Hailey Baptiste in the first and second rounds respectively, before losing to Kaia Kanepi in the next round.

She qualified into the main draw at the Wimbledon Championships making her debut at this Major. She fell in the first round to Dalma Gálfi, in three sets.

At the US Open, she reached the final stage of qualifying following victories over Ekaterine Gorgodze and Valerie Glozman, before losing to Yuan Yue of China.

2023

Performance timelines

Only main-draw results in WTA Tour, Grand Slam tournaments, Fed Cup/Billie Jean King Cup and Olympic Games are included in win–loss records.

Singles
Current after the 2023 United Cup.

Doubles

ITF Circuit finals

Singles: 9 (5 titles, 4 runner-ups)

Doubles: 6 (3 titles, 3 runner-ups)

Notes

References

External links
 
 
 

1998 births
Living people
Australian female tennis players
Tennis players from Perth, Western Australia
Hopman Cup competitors